Ratnagiri–Sindhudurg Lok Sabha constituency is one of the 48 Lok Sabha (lower house of Indian parliament) constituencies of Maharashtra state in western India. This constituency was created on 19 February 2008 as a part of the implementation of the Presidential notification based on the recommendations of the Delimitation Commission of India constituted on 12 July 2002. It first held elections in 2009 and its first member of parliament (MP) was Nilesh Rane of the Indian National Congress. As of the 2014 elections, its current MP is Vinayak Raut of Shiv Sena.

Assembly segments
At present, Ratnagiri–Sindhudurg Lok Sabha constituency comprises six Vidhan Sabha (legislative assembly) segments. These segments are:

Members of Parliament

Election results

General elections 2019

General election 2014

General election 2009

See also
 Rajapur Lok Sabha constituency
 Ratnagiri Lok Sabha constituency
 Raigad Lok Sabha constituency
 Ratnagiri district
 Sindhudurg district

Notes

External links
RatnagiriSindhudurg lok sabha  constituency election 2019 results details

Lok Sabha constituencies in Maharashtra
Lok Sabha constituencies in Maharashtra created in 2008
Ratnagiri district
Sindhudurg district